Parys (pronounced ) is the fifth-largest city in the Free State province of South Africa.It is situated on the banks of the Vaal River in the Free State province of South Africa. The name of the city is the Afrikaans translation of Paris. The name was given by a German surveyor named Schilbach who had participated in the siege of Paris during the Franco-Prussian War and the location next to the Vaal reminded him of Paris on the River Seine. The area of Parys also includes the two townships, Tumahole and Schonkenville. www.parys.co.za

History

In the early 1870s, towns in the Northern Free State were situated very far apart and members of different churches had to travel great distances to participate in religious services. It was then decided by the Ring of the Dutch Reformed Church to implant the idea of a congregation north of the Rhenoster River into the minds of the residents of the farm Klipspruit, on the Vaal River, which was owned by four van Coller brothers. After long deliberation by the brothers, the first slabs were laid out in 1876, and the little town of Parys was born.

The first few years of existence brought little development to the town, but that it was situated en route to Johannesburg from the south, meant that the gold rush of 1886 on the Witwatersrand brought prosperity and wealth to Parys as it was used as a stopover and later as a trading post. The outbreak of the Anglo-Boer war in 1899 brought the bustling town to a standstill as many 'burgers' had to leave the town to fight in the war. The town and surrounding area was the scene of much guerrilla warfare because, surrounded as it is by hills and the river being full of woody islands, it was an ideal place for snipers. General de Wet ensured that good use was made of the natural advantages provided. Some remains of forts are still visible today in the hills around the town.

20th century
The completion of the railway sideline to Parys in 1905 meant that Parys had suddenly become more accessible to the public, and this led to the growth of the town as a holiday resort and industrial centre. The town was now being marketed as The Pride of the Vaal and city dwellers flocked by train to the lush green river banks and special swimming facilities and accommodation provided by the Village Management Board of the time. Bungalows were built on Woody Island and were serviced by the Woody Island Ferry. Unfortunately, this venture did not last very long because of the inaccessibility of the island during the flood periods. By now, residents of the town had felt for quite some time that a bridge across the Vaal River was only its just due. The Woody Island Ferry service crossed on to Woody Island and from there another ferry completed the crossing. The service was infrequent and accidents happened frequently.

Towards the end of 1913, Tenders were requested a reinforced concrete bridge over the Vaal. The project began in May 1914. The outbreak of the First World War three months later caused long delays, and the bridge was only finished and opened for traffic around Christmas 1915. Because of the bridge over the Vaal, trade grew and Parys was a new market for farmers from the then Transvaal side. Many new buildings were built as more and more traffic ran through the town.

Few of the original buildings and historic places remain today. The current Parys Palm Court Hotel is one of the surviving turn of the century buildings (the Parys Hotel), as is the museum (once the magistrate's office) and "Moedergemeente" Church in the centre of town. There are, however, a few original old houses remaining.

Industries that have come and gone are the Orange River Canning Company, Parys Basket Works that used a special willow planted on the river banks, a jam factory, boat building factory, cold drink factory and Parys Roller Milling Company. By the middle 1950s big industries like ARWA, BASA (nuts and bolts factory), Vaalrivierse Tabakkooperasie, Vetsak (agricultural co-op which was founded in Parys) and Metro Clothing Company had settled in the industrial area of Parys. Only a handful of industries remain today, and, like in the early days, the town is becoming increasingly popular as a weekend and holiday destination to people wanting for escape the pressures of city life.

Tourist attractions
Many artists have settled in the town and many new interesting shops and attractions make it the ideal breakaway close to Gauteng and big centres. A unique attraction in Parys, the suspension bridge, was built in 1918 to connect Golf Island to the town. The current Town Hall was built in the 1930s in the typical Art Deco Style, after the original town hall was destroyed by a fire. Parys is in the 5 km buffer zone of the Vredefort Dome World Heritage Site.

The area offers holidaymakers fishing opportunities along the Vaal River and Africa's "Stonehenge" - an area filled with giant granite rocks.

Notable citizens
Springboks great Frik du Preez, named South Africa's rugby player of the 20th century, was educated at Parys High School, although he was born in Rustenburg. Former NFL (American football) placekicker Gary Anderson was born in Parys, although raised in Durban. Parys was the original home of Johann van Schalkwyk, designer of the 2010 World Standards Day poster for the International Organization for Standardization (ISO) 

Parys and the township are home to former Premier of the Free State Province and current Secretary General of the African Nation Congress Ace Magashule.  Tumahole is also home to the current MEC of Education in the Free State, Mr Pule Herbert Isak "Tate" Makgoe.  Bafana Bafana striker Tokelo Rantie also hails from the streets of Tumahole.

One of the most outstanding citizens of Parys/Tumahole is Stompie Seipei, who was a freedom fighter during the time of Apartheid. Stompie joined the fight at an age of only 10 years, becoming the country's youngest political detainee when he spent his 12th birthday in jail without trial. Seipei was kidnapped on 29 December 1988 by the Mandela United Football Club, who were Winnie Mandela's bodyguards. He was accused of being a police informer by the group. 

Stompie Seipei was killed on 1 January 1989. Manankie Seipei, his mother who still lives in Tumahole, identified her son. The funeral was held in Tumahole. In 1991, Winnie Mandela was convicted of kidnapping, but her sentence (6 years in jail) was reduced to a fine and 2 years suspended. The Truth and Reconciliation Commission found her guilty on initiating and participating in the assaults but regarding to the actual murder of Stompie, she was only found “negligent”. Winnie Mandela apologized in person to his mother and the two men accused of killing Stompie also apologized on National TV.

References

External links

 http://www.parys.co.za/
 http://www.parys.mobi

Populated places in the Ngwathe Local Municipality
Populated places established in 1882